Clark Fork Valley Hospital is a full-service community hospital in Plains, Montana, USA.  The hospital features a 24/7 emergency department, Intensive Care Unit, Family Birthing Center, and a complete imaging department anchored by a multi-slice GE lightspeed CT scanner, 3-dimensional ultrasound, echocardiography and all digital imaging. Through a multi-hospital cooperative (MONIDA) a 1.5 tesla GE MRI Unit is on site two days weekly.

Other services include, general surgery, surgical oncology, total joint replacement, orthopedic surgery, cataract surgery, and urology.

The hospital operates three family medicine rural health clinics in  Thompson Falls, Plains and Hot Springs.  All these sites offer family medicine and physical therapy services on site.

Notes

External links 

Hospital buildings completed in 1971
Hospitals in Montana
Buildings and structures in Sanders County, Montana